Pool C of the 2014 Fed Cup Asia/Oceania Group II was one of four pools in the Asia/Oceania Group II of the 2014 Fed Cup. Three teams competed in a round robin competition, with the top team and the bottom two teams proceeding to their respective sections of the play-offs: the top team played for advancement to Group I.

Standings

Round-robin

Turkmenistan vs. Iraq

Kyrgyzstan vs. Iraq

Turkmenistan vs. Kyrgyzstan

References

External links 
 Fed Cup website

C2